Cedarville may refer to the following places in the Canadian province of Ontario:

Cedarville, Grey County, Ontario
Cedarville, Simcoe County, Ontario